Peter Arthur Edward Hastings Forbes, 10th Earl of Granard (born 15 March 1957), is a British peer.

Early life
Peter Arthur Edward Hastings Forbes was born on 15 March 1957. He was the only son of the Hon. John Forbes (1920-1982), a F/Lt. of the Royal Air Force and the former Joan Smith. He has three older sisters, Susan Forbes, Patricia Moira Forbes and Caroline Mary Forbes.

His paternal grandparents were Bernard Forbes, 8th Earl of Granard and Beatrice (née Mills) Forbes, Countess of Granard, an American socialite who was the daughter of Ogden Mills and a descendant of the Livingston and the Schuyler families of New York. On his father's side, he had two aunts, Eileen, Lady Bute of Scotland, and Moira, Countess Rossi of Switzerland. His mother was the third daughter of A. Edward Smith of Sherlockstown House in County Kildare.

He was educated at Eton College.

Career

Upon the death of his uncle, Arthur Forbes, 9th Earl of Granard, who died on 21 November 1992 without male issue, he succeeded as the 5th Baron Granard of Castle Donington, the 10th Viscount of Granard, the 10th Earl of Granard, the 11th Baronet Forbes of Castle Forbes, and the 10th Baron Clanehugh.

Personal life
On 1 September 1980, Viscount Forbes married Nora Anne Mitchell, a daughter of Robert Mitchell of Portarlington, County Laois. Together, they are the parents of four children:

 Hon. Jonathan Peter Hastings Forbes, styled Viscount Forbes (b. 1981)
 Hon. David Robert Hastings Forbes (b. 1984)
 Lady Lisa Ann Forbes (b. 1986)
 Hon. Edward Hastings Forbes (b. 1989)

The family seat is Castle Forbes, near Newtownforbes, the largest estate in County Longford.

References

External links

1957 births
Living people
People educated at Eton College
British people of American descent
British people of Dutch descent
Livingston family
Schuyler family
Earls of Granard
Granard